The Mount Mingan forest mouse (Apomys minganensis) is a forest mouse endemic to Mount Mingan in Luzon, Philippines.

References

Apomys
Rodents of the Philippines
Mammals described in 2011
Endemic fauna of the Philippines